Claxby Pluckacre is a hamlet in the East Lindsey district of Lincolnshire, England. It is in the civil parish of Wood Enderby.

Whilst Claxby Pluckacre is listed in the 1086 Domesday Book, today it is considered a deserted medieval village with slight earthworks visible between Hall Farm and The Grange.

Claxby Pluckacre once had a church dedicated to Saint Andrew, which fell down in 1748 and was never rebuilt. The last priest was instituted 1660–62. Whilst nothing remains it can be seen as earthworks.

Each year, in July, there is an annual pilgrimage to the site of St Andrew's Church. The Mareham le Fen Victory Silver Band provides the music for a service which commemorates the over 250 villages and hamlets lost in Lincolnshire over the past four centuries.

References

External links

Hamlets in Lincolnshire
East Lindsey District